Bonnie Anne Berger is an American mathematician and computer scientist, who works as the Simons professor of mathematics and professor of electrical engineering and computer science at the Massachusetts Institute of Technology. Her research interests are in algorithms, bioinformatics and computational molecular biology.

Education
Berger did her undergraduate studies at Brandeis University, and earned her doctorate from MIT in 1990 under the supervision of Silvio Micali. As a student, she won the Machtey Award in 1989 for a paper on parallel algorithms that she published with fellow student John Rompel at the Symposium on Foundations of Computer Science.

Career and research
After completing her PhD, Berger remained at MIT for postdoctoral research where she became a faculty member in 1992. Her research in bioinformatics has been published in leading peer reviewed scientific journals including Science, the Journal of Algorithms. Her former doctoral students include Serafim Batzoglou, Lior Pachter, Mona Singh, Manolis Kellis, and Phil Bradley.

Berger has served as vice president of the International Society for Computational Biology (ISCB) and chair of the steering committee for RECOMB.

Awards and honours
Berger was the 1997 winner of the Margaret Oakley Dayhoff Award. In 1998 she was an Invited Speaker of the International Congress of Mathematicians in Berlin (but she was unable to make a personal appearance). In 1999, Berger was included in a list of 100 top innovators published by Technology Review. In 2003, Berger became a Fellow of the Association for Computing Machinery (ACM), and in 2012 she became an elected member of the American Academy of Arts and Sciences  and a fellow the International Society for Computational Biology (ISCB).  In 2016, Berger was inducted into the college of fellows of the American Institute for Medical and Biological Engineering (AIMBE). She was included in the 2019 class of fellows of the American Mathematical Society "for contributions to computational biology, bioinformatics, algorithms and for mentoring". She also received the Honorary Doctorate at École Polytechnique Fédérale de Lausanne (EPFL). She serves as a Member-at-Large of the Section on Mathematics at American Association for the Advancement of Science (AAAS). She was awarded the ISCB Accomplishment by a Senior Scientist Award in 2019.  In 2020 she gave the AWM-SIAM Sonia Kovalevsky Lecture, and additionally was elected to the National Academy of Sciences. She was elected as a Fellow of the Society for Industrial and Applied Mathematics, in the 2022 Class of SIAM Fellows, "for pioneering work in computational molecular biology, including comparative and compressive genomics, network inference, genomic privacy, and protein structure prediction".

References

Year of birth missing (living people)
Living people
American computer scientists
20th-century American mathematicians
21st-century American mathematicians
American women computer scientists
American women mathematicians
Brandeis University alumni
MIT School of Engineering alumni
MIT School of Engineering faculty
Fellows of the American Academy of Arts and Sciences
Fellows of the Association for Computing Machinery
Fellows of the International Society for Computational Biology
Fellows of the American Institute for Medical and Biological Engineering
Fellows of the American Mathematical Society
Fellows of the Society for Industrial and Applied Mathematics
20th-century women mathematicians
21st-century women mathematicians
Members of the United States National Academy of Sciences
20th-century American women scientists
21st-century American women scientists